Serdar Bayrak (born 27 August 1985) is a Turkish footballer who plays for German amateur side TSV Rothwesten II.

References

External links
 

1985 births
Sportspeople from Kassel
Footballers from Hesse
German people of Turkish descent
Living people
German footballers
Turkish footballers
Association football midfielders
SC Paderborn 07 players
FC Erzgebirge Aue players
KSV Hessen Kassel players
Çorumspor footballers
Fethiyespor footballers
İnegölspor footballers
2. Bundesliga players
3. Liga players
Regionalliga players
Oberliga (football) players